Diori Hamani International Airport  is an airport in Niamey, the capital of Niger. The airport complex also includes the major base for the Armed Forces of Niger's "Armee d'Air".

Overview

Traffic
In 2019, the airport served 363,093 passengers. The air traffic control for NIM is operated by the ASECNA, which bases one of its five air traffic zones for the continent at Niamey. The airport is named after Hamani Diori (1916–1989), the first President of Niger.

EAMAC
ASECNA operates the "African School for Meteorology and Civil Aviation/Ecole Africaine de la Météorologie et de l'Aviation Civile" at the Niamey airport complex, as well as in the Plateau quarter of Niamey city centre. Founded in 1963, EAMAC trains civil aviation professionals and aviation meteorologists from across Africa.

Base Aérienne 101
The Niger Air Force maintains Base Aérienne 101, collocated with Diori Hamani International Airport, and it is used by both the American and French armed forces for counter-terrorism operations.

In 2013, U.S. African Command spokesman Benjamin Benson confirmed that U.S. air operations conducted from Base Aérienne 101 at Diori Hamani International Airport were providing "support for intelligence collection with French forces conducting operations in Mali and with other partners in the region." In July 2013, The New York Times reported that the deployment had expanded from one Predator UAV to daily flights by a detachment of two larger MQ-9 Reaper remotely piloted aircraft, supported by 120 U.S. Air Force personnel. The MQ-9 Reapers are scheduled to be relocated to Niger Air Base 201.

Around 2013, two Ku band arrays were constructed at the airport to allow for communication with EADS Harfang UAVs. The French Air and Space Force Escadron de Drones 1/33 Belfort has operated three MQ-9 Reapers out of the base since January 2014 in support of Operation Barkhane. France has also deployed Dassault Mirage 2000D aircraft from the French Air Forces detachment (DETAIR) to the base.

The Nigerien Air Force operates two Cessna-208 Caravans equipped for ISTAR operations at the airport.

A French Operational Transport Group is based at the airbase which currently controls Lockheed C-130J Hercules aircraft instead of the previous Transall C-160's.

Airlines and destinations

Statistics

Ground transportation

Road 
Diori Hamani International Airport is situated on Route Nationale 1, which connects it to the city of Niamey  to the northeast, as well as to Dosso, Maradi, Zinder, Goure, Diffa, and N'guigmi to the east.

Rail 
The railway passing by the airport, which connects it to Niamey railway station and Dosso, is abandoned since its construction (and will not be operational in the near future).

See also 
 Niamey
 Transport in Niger

References

External links 

 
 
 
 ais-asecna.org Aeronautical charts for NIAMEY/Diori Hamani (DRRN).

Airports in Niger
Buildings and structures in Niamey
Airport Diori Hamani